Anthemus (1717–1808) was Greek Orthodox Patriarch of Jerusalem (November 4, 1788 – November 22, 1808).

Manuscripts belonging to him were taken to England by Joseph Dacre Carlyle.

1717 births
1808 deaths
18th-century Greek Orthodox Patriarchs of Jerusalem
19th-century Greek Orthodox Patriarchs of Jerusalem